Meptazinol (trade name Meptid) is an opioid analgesic developed by Wyeth in the 1970s. Indications for use in moderate to severe pain, most commonly used to treat pain in obstetrics (childbirth).

Meptazinol is a 3-phenylazepane derivative, whereas the other phenazepanes like ethoheptazine and proheptazine are 4-phenylazepanes.

A partial μ-opioid receptor agonist, its mixed agonist/antagonist activity affords it a lower risk of dependence and abuse than full μ agonists like morphine. Meptazinol exhibits not only a short onset of action, but also a shorter duration of action relative to other opioids such as morphine, pentazocine, or buprenorphine.

References

External links
 

Synthetic opioids
Azepanes
Phenols